Miankuh Sadat (also Romanized as Mīānkūh Sādāt) is a village in Do Hezar Rural District, Khorramabad District, Tonekabon County, Mazandaran Province, Iran. At the 2006 census, its population was 66, in 20 families.

References 

Populated places in Tonekabon County